Monika Maierhofer (born 10 January 1967 in Trofaiach) is an Austrian former alpine skier who competed in the 1992 Winter Olympics and 1994 Winter Olympics.

External links
 sports-reference.com

1967 births
Living people
Austrian female alpine skiers
Olympic alpine skiers of Austria

Alpine skiers at the 1992 Winter Olympics
Alpine skiers at the 1994 Winter Olympics

 In SKI World Cup, She had a Single victory in Slalom, held in Grindelwald, season 1991/92. Also she had 9/nine/ podiums in her WC ski - career ( 1/one/ victory, 7/ seven/second places and 1/one/ third place) all in Slalom.